Du Zhenyu (born February 10, 1983, in Shenyang) is a retired Chinese international footballer.

Club career
Du Zhenyu started his career in 2001 with Changchun Yatai, where in his first season he made eighteen appearances, scoring five goals. He gradually became a team regular for Changchun Yatai beginning in 2003. He established himself as a first-team regular in 2005 when he played a significant role in the promotion of Changchun Yatai to the Chinese Super League by helping Changchun place second in the China League. With Changchun now in the top tier, Du Zhenyu found it relatively easy to translate his prolific goalscoring record from midfield by scoring seven league goals to help Changchun place fourth in the league.

The 2007 league season was to prove the most successful for Du Zhenyu, as he played a significant part in the title-winning Changchun Yatai team, subsequently winning the Footballer of the Year award in the process. The following season saw Changchun play in the AFC Champions League; however, despite scoring several goals and a winning start against Bình Dương F.C., Changchun were unable to get out of the group stages. The 2008 league season wasn't to prove much more successful as Changchun ended the season in sixth; however, Du Zhenyu still continued his prolific goalscoring form by scoring ten league goals.

At the beginning of the 2012 Chinese Super League season, Du lost favour within the team to Liu Weidong, which soon saw him decide to move to Tianjin Teda on loan, where he made his debut on July 14, 2012, against Qingdao Jonoon in a league game that ended in a 0-0 draw. After that game, he quickly established himself as a regular within the team and on July 28, 2012, he scored his first goal for the club in a league game against Beijing Guoan in a 2–1 victory. His productive time at Tianjin was, however, halted when he was fined 35,000 yuan and banned for 7 games for pushing and abusing a referee after being sent off for two bookable offences on October 27, 2012, in a league game against Guizhou Renhe. Despite his suspension carrying on to the following season, Tianjin decided to make his move permanent before the start of the 2013 Chinese Super League.

After the 2014 season he was released by Tianjin. At the age of 32, he decided to return to his former club, Changchun Yatai, and signed a two-year deal with the side.

International career
Du would be called up to the Chinese national team for the first time by the team's manager Zhu Guanghu. He would make his debut in a friendly match against Thailand on August 10, 2006, in a 4–0 win where he also scored his first goal.

International goals

National team

Changchun Yatai

Career statistics
Statistics accurate as of match played 11 November 2018.

Honours
Changchun Yatai
Chinese Super League: 2007
Chinese Jia B League: 2003

References

External links

 

1983 births
Living people
Footballers from Shenyang
Association football wingers
Chinese footballers
China international footballers
Changchun Yatai F.C. players
Tianjin Jinmen Tiger F.C. players
Chinese Super League players
China League One players